Compton Hill Reservoir Park is a  public park located in the Compton Heights neighborhood of St. Louis, Missouri, USA.  Located on one of the highest elevations within the city, the park surrounds a  reservoir used to provide water for many of the city's residents.

History 
James P. Kirkwood selected the site of the reservoir, one of the highest elevations within the 1855 city limits.  As the reservoir occupied only  of the site, Kirkwood suggested the remaining land be turned into a park. The top of the reservoir structure was at one time covered with elevated tennis courts; presently, two newer tennis courts lie to the east.

The water tower was retired in 1929, after 30 years, when the Howard Bend Plant was put in service: the static head from the Stacy Park Reservoir, in what is now the St. Louis suburb of Olivette, caused an overflow of pure chemically treated water into the sewer system.  The reservoir and water tower were renovated, in 1999, at a cost of $19 million.

In 1969, Interstate 44 was constructed through the northern edge of the park, reducing the area of the park to its present size.

Compton Hill Water Tower 

The Compton Hill Water Tower, built in 1898, is the youngest of three remaining stand pipe-water towers in St. Louis. Whereas, in 1901, more than 423 stand pipe style water towers existed in the United States, as of 2008 only about a dozen remain standing, three of which are in St. Louis (the other two being the Bissell Tower and the Grand Avenue Water Tower). The standpipe helped to control the dangerous surges in the city's pipes caused by the reciprocating pumps and maintain an even water pressure. The water tower was designed by Harvey Ellis who also had a hand in designing the headhouse for St. Louis Union Station. Occasionally, the observation deck at the top of the water tower is opened to the public, allowing visitors to see 360-degree panoramic views of the city. The Compton Hill Water Tower was declared a city landmark in 1966 and added to the National Register of Historic Places in 1972.

The Naked Truth

The statue The Naked Truth, unveiled in 1914, was a gift to the city of St. Louis by the German-American Alliance in honor of Carl Schurz, Emil Preetorius and Carl Daenzer, editors of the German St. Louis newspaper Westliche Post.  Controversy erupted over the statue's nudity before the monument was even built when a jury selected the design of Wilhelm Wandschneider, the only non-local sculptor in the design contest.  At the request of Adolphus Busch, who had contributed $20,000 of the $31,000 cost of the monument, the statue was made of bronze instead of white marble to deemphasize the nudity.

The statue was moved to its present location south of the water tower after Interstate 44 was constructed through the northern edge of the park. The statue was designated a city landmark in 1969.

See also
 Chicago Water Tower
 Louisville Water Tower
 Tower Grove East, St. Louis, nearby neighborhood that had a large German American population by the 1850s
 Tower Grove Park, the park located a short distance south on Grand Boulevard

References

External links 

 Compton Hill Reservoir Park official site
  Facebook page
 Compton Hill Water Tower - Compton Heights neighborhood page about the water tower
 The Water Tower and Park Preservation Society
 Built St. Louis: the Water Towers - Information about the three remaining water towers in St. Louis

Parks in St. Louis
Urban public parks
Water supply infrastructure on the National Register of Historic Places
Landmarks of St. Louis
German-American culture in St. Louis
National Register of Historic Places in St. Louis
Industrial buildings and structures on the National Register of Historic Places in Missouri
Tourist attractions in St. Louis
1867 establishments in Missouri